Galactosidase, beta 1, also known as GLB1, is a protein which in humans is encoded by the GLB1 gene.

The GLB1 protein is a beta-galactosidase that cleaves the terminal beta-galactose from ganglioside substrates and other glycoconjugates. The GLB1 gene also encodes an elastin binding protein.

In corn (Zea mays), Glb1 is a gene coding for the storage protein globulin.

Clinical significance 

GM1-gangliosidosis is a lysosomal storage disease that can be caused by a deficiency of β-galactosidase (GLB1). Some cases of Morquio syndrome B have been shown to be due to GLP1 mutations that cause patients to have abnormal elastic fibers.

Elastin receptor 

The RNA transcript of the GLB1 gene is alternatively spliced and produces 2 mRNAs. The 2.5-kilobase transcript encodes the beta-galactosidase enzyme of 677 amino acids. The alternative 2.0-kb mRNA encodes a beta-galactosidase-related protein (S-Gal) that is only 546 amino acids long and that has no enzymatic activity. The S-Gal protein does bind elastin and fragments of elastin that are generated by proteolysis.

The S-Gal protein is a peripheral membrane protein that functions as part of an elastin receptor complex on the surface of cells. The elastin receptor complex includes S-Gal, neuraminidase and Cathepsin A. When elastin-derived peptides bind to the S-Gal protein then the associated neuraminidase enzyme activity is activated and responding cells can have altered signal transduction involving extracellular signal-regulated kinases and regulated matrix metallopeptidase production. Elastin-derived peptides are chemotactic for some cell types and can alter cell cycle progression. The ability of the GLB1-derived elastin binding protein and the elastin receptor complex to influence cell proliferation appears to be indirect and involve removal of sialic acid from extracellular and cell surface proteins such as growth factor receptors.

The S-Gal protein functions during the normal assembly of elastin into extracellular elastic fibers. Elastin is initially present as newly synthesized tropoelastin which can be found in association with S-Gal. The enzymatic activity of neuraminidase in the elastin receptor complex is involved in the release of tropoelastin molecules from the S-Gal chaperone. Cathepsin A is also required for normal elastin biosynthesis.

References

Further reading